FC Bucha is an amateur club from Bucha and the regional competitions of Kyiv Oblast. The club participated in the 2012–13 Ukrainian Cup.

The club originally was founded in 1999.

Honours
Ukrainian Amateur Cup
 Winners (1): 2011

 
Bucha
Bucha
Bucha
Association football clubs established in 1999
1999 establishments in Ukraine